Auberon may refer to:

People
 Auberon Herbert (1838–1906), British writer, theorist, philosopher and son of the 3rd Earl of Carnarvon
 Auberon Herbert, 9th Baron Lucas (1876–1916), British politician and fighter pilot, and grandson of the 3rd Earl of Carnarvon
 Auberon Herbert (landowner) (1922–1974), British landowner and grandson of the 4th Earl of Carnarvon
 Auberon Waugh (1939–2001), English journalist and novelist, and great-grandson of the 4th Earl of Carnarvon

Fictional characters
 Auberon (comics), the King of Faerie in the DC comic series The Sandman and The Books of Magic
 "Auberon", a  short story in The Expanse series